Survivor România 2021  is the second season of Survivor România, a Romanian television series based on the popular reality game show Survivor. This season was officially announced by Kanal D on November 13, 2020, with the applications being open immediately. The season featured 24 contestants divided into two tribes: "Faimoșii", composed of twelve high-achievers who excelled in their fields, and "Războinicii", composed of twelve everyday Romanians. The season premiered on 9 January 2021, and concluded on 10 July 2021, where Edmond Zannidache was named the winner over Andrei Dascălu winning the grand prize of 250.000 lei and title of Sole Survivor. It was the second season to air on Kanal D and was filmed in La Romana, Dominican Republic from January to July 2021.

In this season, the nominations for the elimination can be from both tribes in each week. The TV viewers decide who will be eliminated.For the first time in the show,  TV viewers can vote for their favourite player. The Most Popular player by the public vote will have immunity and has the chance to nominee another contestant for elimination.

Production
On 29 December 2020, Dan Cruceru announced he would be stepping down as presenter after one season. Citing his reasons for leaving, Cruceru said flying back and forth to Dominican Republic "conflicted with [his] new projects" On 6 January, it was announced that former television presenter and swimmer Daniel Pavel would be his replacement.

Contestants
Faimoșii tribe include a kickboxer, Cătălin Moroșanu, who holds the record for longest winning streak in SUPERKOMBAT history with 17 consecutive wins, an international singer-songwriter, Alexandra Stan who made her worldwide breakthrough with the 2010 single "Mr. Saxobeat" and Culiță Sterp, brother of Survivor România 1 finalist Iancu Sterp.

Former artistic gymnast, Ana Porgras and Sindy Szász dropped out before the game began. Porgras was replaced by dancer Elena Marin and Szász by singer Mellina Dumitru.  Porgras eventually returned on Day 26 and Szász on Day 48.

During the game, seventeen new contestants joined the remaining original contestants.

Season summary

Voting history

References

External links

2021 Romanian television seasons
Television shows filmed in the Dominican Republic
Romania